"No Smoke" is a song by American rapper YoungBoy Never Broke Again and the second single from his seventh mixtape AI YoungBoy (2017). It was written by YoungBoy and produced by DJ Chose. The song was ranked number 33 on The Fader's list of the 101 best songs of 2017.

Composition
The song is directed at NBA YoungBoy's foes;  he warns his foes that they don't want any issues with him. Mitch Findlay of HotNewHipHop suggests that it is possibly a subtle response to rappers who are trying to ban him from his own city.

Charts

Weekly charts

Year-end charts

Certifications

References

2017 singles
2017 songs
YoungBoy Never Broke Again songs
Atlantic Records singles
Songs written by YoungBoy Never Broke Again